Francis Godfrey Bertram Arkwright (30 January 1905 – 1 July 1942) was an English army officer and first-class cricketer. Arkwright was a right-handed batsman.

Family
Arkwright was the son of Bertram Harry Godfrey Arkwright (1879–1949) and his wife, Grace Emma Julia Arkwright (née Hurt) (c.1875–1950). Robert Arkwright was his elder brother. His grandfather was the Reverend William Harry Arkwright, the older brother of the politician Francis Arkwright (1846–1915).

Cricket career
Arkwright played in four first-class matches, representing Hampshire in three of those during the 1923 County Championship season. He made his first-class debut for the club against Lancashire, playing two further games that season for the club against Yorkshire, with his final match for Hampshire coming against Lancashire.

Arkwright played one further first-class match in 1925 for the Army against Cambridge University.

War service
In the early 1930s, Arkwright was stationed in the Anglo-Egyptian Sudan, commanding the No. 1 Motor Machine Gun Battery of the Sudan Defence Force, with the rank of Bimbashi (equivalent of captain). The most notable feat of the unit was the occupation of Ain Murr at the very remote Jebel Uweinat in the winter-spring of 1934, during the Sarra Dispute with Italy.

Arkwright fought in the Second World War, reaching the rank of lieutenant colonel. He was killed in action on 1 July 1942, during the North African campaign at Acroma in Libya.

References

External links
Francis Arkwright on Cricinfo
Francis Arkwright on CricketArchive
F.G.B. Arkwright Photographs (history of the occupation of Ain Murr at Jebel Uweinat by the SDF, illustrated with Arkwright's photographs)

1905 births
1942 deaths
People from Bromley
English cricketers
Hampshire cricketers
British Army cricketers
British Army personnel killed in World War II
Royal Armoured Corps officers
Sudan Defence Force officers
Military personnel from Kent